Character Analysis is a 1933 book by Wilhelm Reich.

Background
Reich finished the manuscript in January 1933. He submitted it to the Psychoanalytic Press in Vienna, presided over by Sigmund Freud, who initially accepted it for publication. However, Freud cancelled the contract, wanting to distance himself from Reich's politics. Reich borrowed money and published the book privately in Vienna.

Summary
Reich argues that character structures were organizations of resistance with which individuals avoided facing their neuroses: different character structures — whether schizoid, oral, psychopathic, masochistic, hysterical, compulsive, narcissistic, or rigid — were sustained biologically as body types by unconscious muscular contraction.

Reception
Harry Guntrip wrote that Freud's The Ego and the Id only gained practical importance when Reich's Character Analysis and Anna Freud's The Ego and the Mechanisms of Defence were published, as these books first placed ego-analysis at the centre of psychoanalytic therapy. Character Analysis is referenced in A Thousand Plateaus (1980), by Gilles Deleuze and Félix Guattari.

References

External links
 Reich, W. (1990) Character Analysis (Chapters I-III), 3rd, enlarged edition, trans. Vincent R. Carfagno, Archived from the original on 25 September 2012.

1933 non-fiction books
Works by Wilhelm Reich